Kawartha Conservation is a conservation authority in Ontario, Canada, serving the watershed of the Kawartha Lakes.

Conservation areas
Durham East Cross Forest Conservation Area
Fleetwood Creek Natural Area
Ken Reid Conservation Area
Pigeon River Headwaters Conservation Area
Windy Ridge Conservation Area

See also 
 Conservation Ontario

References

External links 
 

Conservation authorities in Ontario
Conservation areas in Ontario
Kawartha Lakes